Harrison Nejman (born 8 September 2003) is an English professional footballer who plays as a midfielder for  club Barnsley.

Career
Nejman joined the youth-team at Barnsley in October 2017 and signed as a first-team scholar in July 2020. He made his first-team debut on 20 September 2022, coming on for Adam Phillips as a half-time substitute in a 2–0 win over Newcastle United U21 in an EFL Trophy group stage game at Oakwell.

Career statistics

References

2003 births
Living people
English footballers
Association football midfielders
Barnsley F.C. players
English Football League players